This is a list of cities and towns in Burundi.
Bubanza
Buhongo
Bujumbura (former capital)
Bukirasazi
Bururi
Cankuzo
Cibitoke
Gitega (current capital)
Kabezi
Karuzi
Kayanza
Kayero
Kayogoro
Kibondo
Kirundo
Kisozi
Luhwa
Makamba
Magara
Mukenke
Muramvya
Murore
Musenyi
Muyaga
Muyinga
Mwaro
Ngozi
Nyanza-Lac
Rugari
Rumonge
Rutana
Ruyigi
Ruzunga
Zanandore

10 largest cities

See also
 List of cities in East Africa

Burundi, List of cities in
 
Burundi
Cities

simple:Burundi#Largest cities